Heriberto Beltrán Meza (born 3 March 1988) is a Mexican former footballer who played as a forward. He was a Mexico youth International.

Career

Club career

Beltrán started his career with Mexican top flight side Pachuca, where he suffered an eye injury. Before the 2007 season, Beltrán signed for Universidad del Fútbol in the Mexican third tier. In 2008, he signed for Mexican second tier club , where he made 9 league appearances and scored 0 goals. Before the 2010 season, Beltrán signed for Inter de Tehuacán in the Mexican third tier. In 2014, he signed for Mexican second tier team Irapuato.

International career

He represented Mexico internationally at the 2005 FIFA U-17 World Championship, helping them win it for the first time .

References

External links

 

1988 births
Albinegros de Orizaba footballers
Ascenso MX players
Association football forwards
C.F. Pachuca players
Irapuato F.C. footballers
Liga Premier de México players
Living people
Mexican footballers
Mexico youth international footballers
Murciélagos FC footballers
People from Ecatepec de Morelos